The Andean wolf (previously described as Dasycyon hagenbecki, though this now not an accepted taxon) is a purported south american canine that is falsely labelled a wolf. Various tests on the singular pelt have failed to provide a conclusive identity.

History 
In 1927, Lorenz Hagenbeck bought one of three pelts from a dealer in Buenos Aires who claimed that they had come from a wild dog of the Andes. The pelt ended up in Munich where the German mammalogist Ingo Krumbiegel examined it in 1940.
Krumbiegel published two papers describing the animal and giving it the scientific name of Dasycyon hagenbecki. The American zoologist Howard J. Stains supported Krumbeigel's new genus Dasycyon. Other mammalogists believed that the skin was that of a domestic dog.

In 1954 Fritz Dieterlen published results comparing samples of hair taken from the Munich pelt with hair from various canids. He found that there were significant similarities between the Munich pelt hair and German Shepherd hair.

Skull 
In 1935 Krumbiegel is said to have studied a skull supposedly similar that of a maned wolf (Chrysocyon brachyurus) but larger and reportedly obtained from outside of the range of the maned wolf. This gave him confidence in his description of the Munich pelt as a new genus. The whereabouts of the skull are unknown.

Current status 
In 2000 DNA analysis of the pelt was attempted but the samples were found to be contaminated with human, dog, wolf and pig DNA.

See also 
 Culpeo - Lycalopex culpaeus, also known as an Andean wolf.

References

Wolves
Extinct canines
Controversial mammal taxa